Keith Anthony Browning (born 31 July 1938) is a British meteorologist who worked at Imperial College London, the Met Office, and the University of Reading departments of meteorology. His work with Frank Ludlam on the supercell thunderstorm at Wokingham, UK in 1962 was the first detailed study of such a storm. His well regarded research covered many areas of mesoscale meteorology including developing the theory of the sting jet. Arguably his greatest talent is his intuitive understanding of complex three-dimensional meteorological processes which he has described more simply using conceptual models.

He was elected a Fellow of the Royal Society in 1978. He was president of the Royal Meteorological Society from 1988 to 1990.

In 1992, Browning was elected a member of the National Academy of Engineering for fundamental contributions to the detection and understanding of storms, and the development of operational storm-detection and warning systems.

References

External links 
 University of Reading faculty profile

Academics of Imperial College London
Academics of the University of Reading
British meteorologists
Fellows of the Royal Society
Presidents of the Royal Meteorological Society
Carl-Gustaf Rossby Research Medal recipients
1938 births
Living people
Met Office